Paula Badosa Gibert (born 15 November 1997) is a Spanish professional tennis player. She has been ranked as high as world No. 2 in singles by the Women's Tennis Association (WTA), which she achieved on 25 April 2022, and No. 124 in doubles, attained on the same date. She has won three career WTA Tour singles titles, and produced her best performance at a Grand Slam tournament by reaching the quarterfinals of the 2021 French Open. Later that year, she won the Indian Wells Open, a WTA 1000 tournament and her biggest career title to date.

As a junior, Badosa was ranked as high as No. 8 in the world and was the 2015 French Open girls' singles champion. As a professional, she broke into the top 100 in 2019 after making her second consecutive career WTA Tour semifinal at the Karlsruhe Open. The next year, she reached the fourth round at the French Open, her furthest round at a major thus far, and emerged into the top 70. Badosa made new strides in 2021 after a breakthrough clay swing in which she contested her first WTA 500 semifinal in Charleston and WTA 1000 semifinal in Madrid, as well as a WTA 250 final in Belgrade, where she won her maiden WTA title. By doing so, she entered the top 40, and shortly broke into the top ten following her first WTA 1000 title at Indian Wells and WTA Finals debut later that fall. In 2022, Badosa notched her fourth career fourth-round performance at a major at the Australian Open, guaranteeing her top five debut.

Badosa is an aggressive baseliner, whose game style is centered around her big serve and groundstrokes. At , she possesses one of the fastest serves on tour, allowing her to dictate rallies, but she is also an athletic counterpuncher, whose defense has enabled her to reach drop shots and cover all angles on the court.

Early life and background
Paula Badosa was born in Manhattan, New York, to Spanish parents Mireia Gibert Baró and Josep Badosa Codolar. Both of her parents worked in fashion. When she was seven, Badosa and her family moved to Barcelona. She then started playing tennis, at Club Tennis d'Aro (Platja d'Aro). At the age of 14, she moved to Valencia in order to progress in tennis. At the age of 17, she returned to Barcelona.

Besides Spanish, she speaks Catalan, English and a little French. Her favourite tournament is the US Open. Her idols growing up were Rafael Nadal and Maria Sharapova.   Badosa has also said she is a huge admirer of Simona Halep.

When she was a child she aspired to be a model, following her parents' path. She has struggled with depression and anxiety.

Junior career

Badosa is a former junior world No. 8. She made her debut at the ITF Junior Circuit in September 2012, at the age of 14. In February 2014, she won her first junior singles title at the Grade-1 Mediterranee Avenir in Casablanca. In April 2014, she won the doubles title at a Grade-1 tournament, the Trofeo Juan Carlos Ferrero in Villena. In May 2014, she reached the semifinals of the Grade-A Trofeo Bonfiglio in doubles.

In the juniors division of the 2014 French Open, she reached the quarterfinals in both singles and doubles. She then reached the quarterfinals in the juniors division at Wimbledon in singles. She finished runner-up at the European Junior Championships in singles, losing to compatriot Sara Sorribes Tormo, and finished runner–up in doubles. She completed her junior career at the 2015 French Open, where she won the girls' singles title. In juniors she won three singles and one doubles titles on the circuit.

Professional career

2012–2020: Major main draw, and top 100 debut
Badosa made her debut on the ITF Women's Circuit in May 2012 in Getxo. In November 2013, she won her first title in Sant Jordi.

In March 2015, she made her first breakthrough after receiving a wildcard for the main draw at the Premier Mandatory Miami Open, where she recorded her first two match wins on the WTA Tour. In the third round, she lost to 14th seed Karolína Plíšková. Later, she reached the main draw of the Madrid Open through qualifying, but retired in her first-round match against Sara Errani.

At the 2018 Morocco Open, she reached the quarterfinals and lost to Aleksandra Krunić. In September, she won the $60k Open de Valencia, defeating fellow Spaniard Aliona Bolsova in the final.

At the 2019 Australian Open, she made her Grand Slam main-draw debut, after passing qualifying; she lost to wildcard Kimberly Birrell in the first round. In July, she reached her first WTA semifinal at the Palermo Open, but then lost to world No. 5, Kiki Bertens. She followed this by reaching the semifinals of the WTA Challenger Karlsruhe Open. After that, she debuted in the top 100. At the Korea Open, she reached the quarterfinals but then lost to Wang Yafan.

In the early 2020 season, Badosa recorded her first Grand Slam match-win at the Australian Open, defeating qualifier Johanna Larsson in the first round. She then lost to world No. 7, Petra Kvitová. In September, she reached the semifinals at the İstanbul Cup, where she lost to Eugenie Bouchard. Her biggest result of the year was at the French Open, where she reached her first round of 16 at a major tournament. There, she defeated two former Grand Slam champions, Sloane Stephens and Jeļena Ostapenko.

2021: Indian Wells title, top 10
In May, Badosa reached her first WTA 1000 semifinal at the Madrid Open, making her the first Spanish woman to reach the semifinals in the tournament history, defeating No. 8 seed Belinda Bencic. She faced top seed and world No. 1, Ashleigh Barty, in the semifinal, where Barty got her revenge. As a result, Badosa reached a new career-high of world No. 42.

At the Serbia Open, she reached a third straight clay-court semifinal, defeating seventh seed Rebecca Peterson. As a result, she entered the top 40 for the first time in her career and went on to win her maiden title after Ana Konjuh retired injured in the final.

Initially unseeded at the French Open, she was promoted to seed No. 33 after the withdrawal of Alison Riske. Badosa beat Lauren Davis and Danka Kovinić in straight sets before facing Ana Bogdan. Having saved a match point in the second set, she went on to take the match in three sets to move into the fourth round of the French for the second year in a row. She then faced former finalist and 20th seed Markéta Vondroušová, whom she defeated in three sets to move into the quarterfinals of a major for the first time in her career. Here, despite being up a break in the final set, she fell to Tamara Zidanšek.

Badosa represented Spain in the 2020 Summer Olympics women's singles and women's doubles events. Badosa and her partner Sara Sorribes Tormo beat Mexican pairing Giuliana Olmos and Renata Zarazúa in the first round, before losing in the second to Czech pairing and eventual gold medalists, Barbora Krejčíková and Kateřina Siniaková. 
In singles, Badosa won her first three matches against French Kristina Mladenovic, Polish Iga Świątek and Argentinian Nadia Podoroska. In her quarterfinal match against the eventual silver medalist, Czech Markéta Vondroušová, Badosa lost the first set before retiring from her match due to heatstroke caused by the hot, humid conditions in Tokyo – ultimately resulting in her having a long medical timeout and needing to leave the court via wheelchair. This, along with complaints from other tennis players such as Daniil Medvedev and Novak Djokovic, was the catalyst for Olympic officials to change the earliest start time for matches from 11 a.m. to 3 p.m.

On 12 August 2021, Badosa parted ways with her coach Javier Martí whom she had worked with for eleven months. This was announced a day after suffering a loss against Rebecca Marino in the round of 16 of the Canadian Open. On 23 August 2021, following her second WTA 1000 quarterfinal at the Cincinnati Open where she defeated en route Petra Martić, third seed Aryna Sabalenka and Elena Rybakina, she reached a career-high in singles of world No. 26. On 17 October 2021, Badosa defeated former two-time champion Victoria Azarenka in a three-hour thriller match to win the Indian Wells tournament, for her first WTA 1000 title. Following this successful run, she made her top 10 debut on 8 November 2021. She qualified for the 2021 WTA Finals and was the first in her round robin group to reach the semifinals.

2022: Third career title, world No. 2

After beginning her 2022 season with a first-round loss to Victoria Azarenka at the Adelaide International, Badosa claimed her third career title in Sydney by defeating reigning French Open champion Barbora Krejčíková in three sets in the final. With the win, she rose to a new career-high ranking of No. 6.

At the Australian Open, where she was seeded sixth, Badosa reached the fourth round for the first time, where she lost to unseeded Madison Keys in straight sets.

After early exits at Dubai and Doha, Badosa reached the semifinals at Indian Wells and the quarterfinals at Miami, where she had to retire due to an illness. With those results, and Barty's retirement, she rose to a new career-high ranking of No. 3.
Following her semifinal showing at the Stuttgart Open, she rose to world No. 2 on 25 April 2022. At the French Open, Badosa retired from her third-round match against Veronika Kudermetova due to a calf injury. After losing to Jodie Burrage at Eastbourne, Badosa defeated Petra Kvitová in the third round of Wimbledon. In the fourth round, she was defeated by Simona Halep in straight sets. Badosa hit 20 unforced errors and seven winners compared to nine unforced errors and 17 winners for Halep.

At Toronto, Badosa retired from her second-round match against Yulia Putintseva due to cramping. At the Cincinnati Open, she lost in the second round to Ajla Tomljanović in a tough three-set match lasting more than two hours. At the US Open, she defeated Lesia Tsurenko in the first round, before falling to Petra Martić, in three sets, in the second round.

In receipt of first-round byes in Tokyo and Ostrava, Badosa was defeated in the second round of both tournaments by Zheng Qinwen and Petra Kvitová, respectively. She continues to perform poorly in the last tournaments of the season as she lost to Danielle Collins in San Diego quarterfinals and retired against Victoria Azarenka in Guadalajara second round, after losing the first set. 

She ended the season losing eight out of her last ten matches and outside of the top 10 at world No. 13.

2023: Out of top 25
She withdrew from the 2023 Australian Open due to abductor injury sustained during her quarterfinal at the 2023 Adelaide International 2 against Beatriz Haddad Maia. She subsequently also withdrew also from the 2023 Abu Dhabi Open. As a result she dropped out of the top 20 on 6 February 2023.

At the 2023 Qatar Total Open she lost in the first round to Haddad Maia again in straight sets. At the 2023 Dubai Tennis Championships she also lost in the first round to 14th seed Liudmila Samsonova in the third longest match of the year lasting three hours and 22 minutes.

Playing style

Badosa is an aggressive baseliner, whose game is centred around her powerful serve and groundstrokes. Badosa has described her serve as her favourite shot, with her serve being a major weapon. Her first serve has been recorded as high as 122 mph (196 km/h), allowing her to serve multiple aces in any given match, and to dictate play from the first stroke. Due to her effective first serve, she typically wins a high percentage of first serve points. She also possesses effective and reliable kick and slice serves that she deploys as second serves, preventing opponents from scoring free points off her second serve; she is also proficient at defending her second serve. When Badosa is nervous, however, she takes risks on her second serve, occasionally leading to a relatively high double fault count.

Badosa's strongest groundstroke is her two-handed backhand, with which she dominates opponents on the court, and she hits large numbers of winners with this shot. Badosa's forehand is also powerful, being hit with relentless depth and power; she frequently utilises the reverse forehand, also known as the 'buggy-whip' forehand, allowing her to generate extreme angles, and hit winners from defensive positions. Badosa likes to play short points, and will frequently utilise aggressive serve and groundstroke combinations to finish points quickly with outright winners.

Despite this, Badosa possesses a remarkably complete defensive game, with her superb movement, footwork, court coverage, and stamina allowing her to counterpunch, and to create opportunities to hit winners at the end of long rallies. She also possesses an effective drop shot, and will employ the sliced backhand to change the pace of rallies, and disrupt her opponent's rhythm. Badosa rarely approaches the net, except to retrieve short balls and drop shots; as she gains more doubles experience, however, she is beginning to attack the net with increasing frequency. She is also a formidable opponent on the court, known for her mental toughness, composure, and strength under pressure.

Badosa's favourite surface is clay, having grown up on the surface, and she has won 85% of her matches on clay courts throughout 2021, up to and including the French Open. Due to her aggressive playing style, clay court prowess, mental toughness, physical appearance, and the similarity in the mechanics of their serves, she has been frequently compared to her idol, Maria Sharapova.

Endorsements
Badosa is endorsed by Nike for clothing, shoes, and apparel, after having been previously endorsed by Adidas. Badosa is endosrsed by Wilson for racquets, specifically using the Wilson Blade 98. She has also been signed as a brand ambassador for Iberdrola, a Spanish power company.

Personal life
Since 2021, Badosa has been in a relationship with Cuban model and actor Juan Betancourt. She is multilingual, speaking four languages fluently: Spanish, Catalan, English, and French.

Career statistics

Grand Slam singles performance timeline

References

External links
 
 

1997 births
Living people
Tennis people from New York (state)
Tennis players from Barcelona
Spanish female tennis players
American female tennis players
American people of Spanish descent
French Open junior champions
Grand Slam (tennis) champions in girls' singles
Olympic tennis players of Spain
Tennis players at the 2020 Summer Olympics
21st-century American women
Sportspeople from New York City